The Outdatedness of Human Beings (where  can be translated as outdatedness, antiquatedness or obsolescence) is a two-volume work by philosopher and journalist Günther Anders. It was first published by C.H. Beck in Munich in 1956.

Reviews 
 Daniel Morat, "Timeliness of Guenther Anders' Obsoleteness, Anthropology in the Industrial Age." Institute of Contemporary History, Georg-August Universitaet Goettingen.
 "Guenther Anders' media critique and attention disorder". Frankfurter Allgemeine Zeitung.
 Radio program "Buch-Tipps". Guenther Anders. Schweizer Rundfunk und Fernsehen. 
 Roland Merk, writer. Guenther Anders.
 Christian Dries, philosopher University of Freiburg. "From The Outdatedness of Human Beings to and Ethics of Contingency, Guenther Anders as a Thinker of the Present." Symposium. Waldhof Akademie ruer Weiterbildung.
 Frank Hartmann, lecture University of Vienna. "Outdatedness of Human Beings. Philosophy of Technology and Media Critique"

English translations 

 The Obsolescence of Man, Volume I. Translated by Josep Monter Pérez
 The Obsolescence of Man, Volume II. Translated by Josep Monter Pérez

References

External links
 A summary of the book in English from notbored.org

German books
1956 non-fiction books
Philosophical literature